Verbena demissa is a species of plant in the family Verbenaceae. It is endemic to Ecuador.  Its natural habitats are subtropical or tropical moist montane forests and subtropical or tropical high-altitude grassland.

References

demissa
Endemic flora of Ecuador
Near threatened flora of South America
Taxonomy articles created by Polbot